The House of Jamalullail is the current ruling house of the state of Perlis in Malaysia.

It was founded in 1843 together with the formation of the state of Perlis as a monarchy, after the Sultan of Kedah, Sultan Ahmad Tajuddin II gave his endorsement to the Jamalullail family for the secession of Perlis from Kedah with the Jamalullail family as its hereditary rulers.

Before the House of Jamalullail ascended to rule as Rajas of Perlis, the most prominent title in Perlis was the Raja Muda or Yang di-Pertuan Muda of Perlis and Kedah (crown prince of Perlis and Kedah), a title comparable to Prince of Wales within the United Kingdom. Sultan Dhiauddin II of Kedah who built Kota Indera Kayangan as his capital was honorifically titled as Raja Muda of Perlis and Kedah. He was titled as such in a treaty to cede Province Wellesley.

The hereditary ruler of Perlis is also the head of its royal household. Unlike most of the other Malaysian states with its own hereditary rulers which are accorded with the title of "Sultan", the hereditary rulers of Perlis are accorded with the title of "Raja". As with other rulers from other states in Malaysia, the Raja of Perlis participate in the election of the Yang di-Pertuan Agong and is qualified to serve a five-year term as the Yang di-Pertuan Agong if elected.

History

Origins

The Jamalullail (also pronounced  in Arabic) clan was of Hadhrami Arab origin and founded as an offshoot from the greater Alawi lineage in the 15th century. The name "Jamal Al-Layl" is loosely translated into English as "Camel of the night"; legend mentioned of its clan founder, Muhammad Jamal Al-Layl had a habit of wandering around at night to fill the wells and fountains of the mosques. Members of the Jamal Al-Layl clan migrated to Madagascar, Zanzibar, India, Aceh, Comoros and Malaysia, where descendants of these migrants either rose to influential political positions or established ruling houses.

The ancestor of the Jamalullail clan of Perlis, Sayyid Ahmad bin Husayn Jamal Al-Layl, migrated to Kedah from Hadhramaut sometime in 1735 and married the daughter from an Arab-Malay family, Sharifah Aminah Al-Qadri. He settled in Chana village, which was on the border of Siam and Kedah at that time. He earned his living as a trader and was reportedly a well-respected figure in the state. Sayyid Ahmad's son with Sharifah Aminah, Sayyid Harun followed his father's footsteps as a trader, in addition to being a well-known religious scholar. He was later admitted into the Kedah royal court and became a close aide of the Sultan of Kedah, Ahmad Tajuddin (II) Halim Shah. He later married a princess from the Kedah royal family, Tengku Safiah, and was later made the Penghulu (district chief) of Arau in 1797.

Establishment

When the Thai army invaded and occupied Kedah between 1821 and 1842, local Arab families supported the Sultan's efforts to lead resistance efforts against Thai rule. Arab leaders employed a two-pronged approach of religious militancy and diplomacy to free Kedah from Thai rule, among which the Jamal Al-Layl family played a leading role in these efforts and often carried out negotiations to persuade the Thais to regain the state's independence. The Thais later agreed to restore the Sultan of Kedah to his throne in 1842. The following year, Sayyid Hussein Jamal Al-Layl from Chana (now in Songkhla, Thailand) was installed by the Thais as the first Raja of Perlis, after the Sultan of Kedah gave his endorsement for the formation of Perlis.

Succession dispute

In 1933, the fourth Raja of Perlis, Syed Alwi Jamalullail looked to the State Council to elect an heir presumptive to the royal throne of Perlis. The State Council chose Syed Hassan among several possible contenders as the heir-presumptive. Syed Hassan was a nephew by his older half-brother Syed Mahmud. An illness struck Syed Hassan the following year; he died shortly after that.

The State Council held another vote, and elected Syed Hassan's son, Syed Putra as the new heir presumptive. Another contender, Syed Hamzah, a younger half-brother of Syed Alwi and the Vice-President of the state council, dissented on the outcome of the choice as it ran afoul of the Islamic inheritance laws. The Raja (Syed Alwi) and the British maintained their support for Syed Putra, but as Syed Alwi fell ill at the outbreak of World War II in 1941, Syed Hamzah seized the opportunity to exert influence over the political affairs of the state. Following the demise of Syed Alwi in 1943, Syed Hamzah was installed as the Raja of Perlis, with the support of the Japanese. When the British returned in 1945, Syed Hamzah abdicated under pressure from the British and moved in to install Syed Putra as the Raja of Perlis.

After World War II

The Raja of Perlis took part in the first Conference of Rulers and the first election of the Yang di-Pertuan Agong and his deputy in 1948 and 1957 respectively, both of which were also participated by the eight other Malayan states with its own hereditary rulers. In 1960, Syed Putra became the third Yang di-Pertuan Agong of Malaysia and served a five-year term from 1960 to 1965.

List of penghulus of Arau (1797–1843) and rajas of Perlis (1843–present) 

 Syed Abu Bakar Harun Jamalullail (1797–1825)
 Syed Hussein Jamalullail (1825–1873) (independent Raja of Perlis )
 Syed Ahmad Jamalullail (1873–1887)
 Syed Saffi Jamalullail (1887–1905)
 Syed Alwi Jamalullail (1905–1943)
 Syed Hamzah Jamalullail (1943–1945) (abdicated)
 Syed Harun Putra Jamalullail (1945–2000)
 Syed Sirajuddin Jamalullail (2000–present)

See also 

 Monarchies of Malaysia
 Family tree of Perlis monarchs
 Family tree of Malaysian monarchs

Notes

References

 Anne K. Bang, Sufis and Scholars of the Sea: Family Networks in East Africa, 1860-1925, Routledge, 2003, 
 Central Office of Information. Reference Division, Commonwealth survey, Published for the Central Office of Information by H.M.S.O., 1960
 Europa Publications Staff, The Far East and Australasia 2003, Routledge, 2002, 
 Gulrose Karim, D J M Tate, Information Malaysia, Berita publications, 2005
 Institut Tadbiran Awam Negara, Malaysia kita, 1991, 
 J. M. Gullick, Rulers and Residents: Influence and Power in the Malay States, 1870-1920, Oxford University Press, 1992, 
 Mahani Musa, Kongsi Gelap Melayu di Negeri-Negeri Utara Pantai Barat Semenanjung Tanah Melayu, 1821 hingga 1940-an, Malaysian Branch of the Royal Asiatic Society, 2003, 
 Ruth Barnes, Ships and the Development of Maritime Technology on the Indian Ocean, Routledge, 2002, 
 Ulrike Freitag, W. G. Clarence-Smith, Hadhrami Traders, Scholars, and Statesmen in the Indian Ocean, 1750s-1960s: 1750s- 1960s, BRILL, 1997,

External links
 Official Web Portal of the royal family of Perlis (in Malay and English)

 
.
History of Perlis
Perlis
Hadhrami people
Malaysian people of Yemeni descent
1843 establishments in Asia
1840s establishments in British Malaya
1843 establishments in the British Empire